Mislav Komorski (born 17 April 1992) is a Croatian professional footballer. Who is currently playing for Croatian Club Kustošija.

Club career
A product of Dinamo Zagreb Academy, Komorski signed a professional contract with the club in June 2010, before having it rescinded a month later, to sign an equally long contract with NK Lokomotiva until 2017, Dinamo's farm team as means of getting around the "6 loaned players maximum" rule. He has since become a fixture in the Lokomotiva first team.

Komorski has since 21 February 2013, been on a trial with the Danish Superliga side SønderjyskE.

After a two-season stint at NK Hrvatski Dragovoljac, Komorski signed in the summer of 2015 for NK Inter Zaprešić.

Komorski signed for Indian club Northeast United for the 2018-19 season. He played an important role in team's defense. He got injured during the team's match against Bengaluru and was unable to play the remainder of the season.

International career
Internationally, Komorski represented Croatia at all youth levels and was a regular member of the Croatia under-19 team.

References

External links
 

1992 births
Living people
Footballers from Zagreb
Association football central defenders
Croatian footballers
Croatia youth international footballers
NK Lokomotiva Zagreb players
NK Hrvatski Dragovoljac players
NK Inter Zaprešić players
NorthEast United FC players
NK Sesvete players
HNK Orijent players
NK Kustošija players
Croatian Football League players
First Football League (Croatia) players
Indian Super League players
Croatian expatriate footballers
Expatriate footballers in India
Croatian expatriate sportspeople in India